Edward "Eddie" Coady (born 1978) is an Irish hurler who plays as a left corner-forward for the Carlow senior team.

Coady made his first appearance for the team during the 1999 National League and has become a regular member of the starting fifteen since then. During that time he has won two Christy Ring Cup medals, one National League (Division 2A) medal and three Kehoe Cup medals.

At club level Coady is an All-Ireland and Leinster medalist at intermediate level with Mount Leinster Rangers. He has also won four county senior championship medals.

Honours
 Carlow Senior Hurling Championship (8) 2006 2007 2009 2011 2012 2013 2017 2018
 Carlow Senior Hurling League (1) 2011
 Leinster Intermediate Club Hurling Championship (1) 2011
 All-Ireland Intermediate Club Hurling Championship (1) 2012
 Christy Ring Cup (3) 2008 2009 2017
 Kehoe Cup (3) 1999 2005 2006
 National Hurling League Division 2 (1) 2008
 National Hurling League Division 2A (1) 2012
 Leinster Senior Club Hurling Championship (1) (2013)

References

1978 births
Living people
Mount Leinster Rangers hurlers
Carlow inter-county hurlers